Fernando Román Álvarez (born 20 August 1993) is a Spanish footballer who plays for Córdoba CF as a centre back.

Football career
A product of Real Madrid's youth system, Román made his senior debuts in 2012–13 with AD Unión Adarve's reserves in the lower leagues, being promoted to the main squad in Tercera División shortly after. On 21 June 2014 he joined AD Alcorcón, being assigned to the B-team also in the fourth level.

Román played his first match as a professional on 1 February 2015, starting in a 0–3 away loss against Girona FC in the Segunda División championship. He scored his first goal in the category on 17 October, but in a 2–3 loss at Real Oviedo.

On 1 August 2016, Román was loaned to Hércules CF in Segunda División B, for one year. He continued to appear in the category in the following years, representing SD Ponferradina, Valencia CF Mestalla and Córdoba CF. On 13 January 2020, Román was loaned out to Marbella FC until the summer 2021.

Personal life
Román's elder brother, Juan Carlos, is also a footballer and a defender. He too was groomed at Unión Adarve. His father, Juanqui, was a professional handball player and represented Spain in more than 30 occasions.

References

External links
Alcorcón official profile 

1993 births
Living people
Footballers from Madrid
Spanish footballers
Association football defenders
Segunda División players
Tercera División players
AD Alcorcón B players
AD Alcorcón footballers
Hércules CF players
SD Ponferradina players
Valencia CF Mestalla footballers
Córdoba CF players
Marbella FC players